The 1979 Trans America Athletic Conference (TAAC) baseball tournament, the first-ever for the league known since the 2001–02 school year as the Atlantic Sun Conference, was held at Centenary Park on the campus of Centenary College in Shreveport, Louisiana, from May 10 through 13.  Mercer won the first tournament championship.  As a new conference, the TAAC did not have an automatic bid to the 1979 NCAA Division I baseball tournament.

Format
The new league used a blind draw to determine matchups, and records for any earlier games between conference members are incomplete.  The teams played a five team, double elimination tournament.

Results

* - Indicates game required 10 innings.

All-Tournament Team
The following players were named to the All-Tournament Team.  No MVP was named until 1985.

References

Tournament
Trans America Athletic Conference baseball tournament
Trans America Athletic Conference baseball tournament
ASUN Conference Baseball Tournament